The 2019 Northeast Conference women's soccer tournament was the postseason women's soccer tournament for the Northeast Conference held on November 8 and 10, 2019. The three-match tournament took place at Central Connecticut Soccer Field in New Britain, Connecticut, home of the regular season champions and tournament #1 seed Central Connecticut State Blue Devils. The four-team single-elimination tournament consisted of two rounds based on seeding from regular season conference play. The defending champions were the Central Connecticut State Blue Devils who successfully defended their title, defeating the Fairleigh Dickinson Knights 1–0 in the final. This was the tenth Northeast Conference tournament title for the Central Connecticut women's soccer program, eight of which have come under the direction of head coach Mick D'Arcy.

Bracket

Schedule

Semifinals

Final

Statistics

Goalscorers 
2 Goals
 Emily Bardes (Central Connecticut)

1 Goal
 Lea Egner (Fairleigh Dickinson)
 Emily Hogan (Central Connecticut)
 Meadow Mancini (Sacred Heart)
 Roma McLaughlin (Central Connecticut)
 Paula Ruess (Fairleigh Dickinson)

All-Tournament team

Source:

MVP in bold

See also 
 Northeast Conference
 2019 NCAA Division I women's soccer season
 2019 NCAA Division I Women's Soccer Tournament

References

External links 
2018 Northeast Conference Women's Soccer Tournament

Northeast Conference Women's Soccer Tournament
2019 Northeast Conference women's soccer season